Clell Lavern "Butch" Hobson Jr. (born August 17, 1951) is an American former professional baseball third baseman and manager. He is the current manager for the Chicago Dogs of the American Association of Professional Baseball.

Hobson played in Major League Baseball (MLB) for the Boston Red Sox, California Angels, and New York Yankees. Since retiring as an active player, he has managed several Minor League Baseball teams, and served as manager of the Boston Red Sox during 1992–1994.

Playing career
Hobson attended Bessemer City High School then University of Alabama, where he played both college football and college baseball. He was a backup quarterback for the Crimson Tide football team, under Bear Bryant, from 1969 through 1972. Hobson appeared in 11 games for Alabama, all during the 1971 season.

Hobson was a standout player for the Crimson Tide baseball program, leading the team in 1973 with 38 hits, 13 home runs, and 37 RBIs in 36 games, along with being named a First Team All-SEC selection. He was named to Alabama's All-Century baseball team in 1993.

Boston Red Sox
Selected by the Boston Red Sox in the 1973 MLB draft, Hobson made his major league debut in 1975. His most productive season came in 1977, when he set team season records for a third baseman with 30 home runs and 112 RBIs.  In 1978, Hobson hit 17 home runs with 80 RBIs. However, he posted 43 errors, the most for any American League player in that season, and his .899 fielding average also was the first below .900 by a regular player in 60 years. Hobson hit 28 home runs with 93 RBIs in 1979, but a year later, an injury to his right elbow landed him on the disabled list for major parts of that season and the next.

In parts of six seasons with the Red Sox, Hobson batted .252 with 94 home runs and 358 RBIs.

California Angels

Hobson was traded along with Rick Burleson from the Red Sox to the Angels for Carney Lansford, Rick Miller and Mark Clear on December 10, 1980. During the 1981 season, Hobson played 85 games with the Angels, batting .235 with 4 home runs and 36 RBIs.

New York Yankees
Hobson was dealt from the Angels to the Yankees for Bill Castro during spring training on March 24, 1982. He finished his major league career in 1982, appearing in 30 games while batting .172 with three RBIs. He played with the Yankees' Triple-A affiliate, the Columbus Clippers, through 1985.

Career totals
In an eight-year MLB career, Hobson had a .248 batting average with 98 home runs and 397 RBI in 738 games. He holds the MLB record for fewest career home runs by a player with a 30 home run season.

In September 2016, at age 65, Hobson had a single at bat for the Lancaster Barnstormers, an independent baseball league team that he was the manager of, so that he could appear in a professional baseball game with his son K. C. Hobson. He struck out swinging.

Managerial career
Hobson first managed in the New York Mets farm system, leading the Class A Columbia Mets in 1987 and 1988.

Hobson next managed in Boston's minor league system, leading the Double-A New Britain Red Sox in 1989 and 1990. He then managed the Pawtucket Red Sox for the 1991 season and posted a 79–64 record to lead his team to a first-place finish in the International League, and was named the International League Manager of the Year. After losing the Governors' Cup to the Columbus Clippers, he was hired to manage the parent club in MLB. Hobson managed the Boston Red Sox from 1992 to 1994, posting an overall 207–232 record.

Hobson next managed the Mobile BaySharks in the independent Texas–Louisiana League for the 1995 season.

In May 1996, while managing the Scranton/Wilkes-Barre Red Barons, then a Triple-A affiliate of the Philadelphia Phillies, Hobson was arrested for possession of cocaine—he was placed on leave, and subsequently fired in August. His record during his brief stint with the Red Barons was 13–14.

After not managing during the 1997 and 1998 seasons, Hobson returned to managing in 1999, leading the Sarasota Red Sox.

Hobson managed the Nashua Pride for the 2000 through 2007 seasons with a record of 508–456. The team won the Atlantic League Championship in 2000, and the Can-Am League Championship in 2007. On rare occasions when an umpire ejected Hobson from a game for arguing a baserunning decision, Hobson would remove one of the bases and deliver it to a young fan before leaving the stadium. This signature move was one of the meanings of Stolen Bases, a movie the Pride commissioned in 2000. For example, Hobson "stole" first base on July 27, 2007, when a baserunner for the North Shore Spirit was called out at first base, then ruled safe after a protest by the opposing manager. The base was always retrieved, allowing the game to resume.

On November 19, 2007, Hobson was named the first-ever manager of the Southern Maryland Blue Crabs in the independent Atlantic League of Professional Baseball. He won manager of the year for the Atlantic League for the 2008 season, and led the team through the 2010 season.

On October 19, 2010, Hobson was named manager of the Lancaster Barnstormers of the Atlantic League; he managed the Barnstormers for the 2011 through 2016 seasons.

On January 5, 2017, Hobson was named manager of the Class A Kane County Cougars of the Midwest League; He managed the Cougars during the 2017 season.

On March 19, 2018, Hobson was named manager of the Chicago Dogs of the independent American Association of Independent Professional Baseball.

Managerial record

Personal life
Following his May 1996 arrest in Rhode Island for cocaine possession, Hobson faced up to three years in jail and a $5,000 fine. He pleaded innocent, and in December 1996 was placed in a diversion program for first-time offenders after acknowledging past use of the drug.

Hobson's son K. C. played baseball for Stockdale High School where the elder Hobson was an assistant baseball coach in 2008 and 2009, helping the Mustangs win two CIF section championships. Later, K. C. was selected by the Toronto Blue Jays in the sixth round of the 2009 MLB draft. He has played in Minor League Baseball for Toronto and San Francisco Giants organizations as a first baseman, reaching the Double-A level. He most recently played in 2021 for the independent American Association's Chicago Dogs managed by Butch Hobson.

Sources
The ESPN Baseball Encyclopedia – Gary Gillette, Peter Gammons, Pete Palmer. Publisher: Sterling Publishing, 2005. Format: Paperback, 1824pp. Language: English.

References

Further reading

External links

1951 births
Living people
Alabama Crimson Tide baseball players
Alabama Crimson Tide football players
American Association of Professional Baseball managers
American football quarterbacks
Baseball coaches from Alabama
Baseball players from Alabama
Boston Red Sox managers
Boston Red Sox players
Boston Red Sox scouts
Bristol Red Sox players
California Angels players
Chicago Dogs
Columbus Clippers players
Major League Baseball third basemen
New York Yankees players
Pawtucket Red Sox managers
Players of American football from Alabama
Rhode Island Red Sox players
Sportspeople from Tuscaloosa, Alabama
Winston-Salem Red Sox players
Winter Haven Super Sox players
Bessemer City High School (Alabama) alumni